was a private junior college  in Setagaya Ward in Tokyo, Japan. It was set up in 1966.

History 
 It started in 1924 as a sewing cram school.
 The Aobagakuen Junior College Housekeeping Department was set up in 1966.
 "Food and nutrition" was added to the curriculum in 1967.
 It was made coeducational in 2001. The housekeeping department was changed into the man life subject.
 It is ended to want the student in fiscal year 2004. It shifts to Tokyo Health Care University from the next year.
 It was abolished in 2006.

Subject 
 Man life subject
 Food nourishment subject

Related item 
 Tokyo Health Care University
 Tama University

Universities and colleges in Tokyo
Educational institutions established in 1966
Japanese junior colleges
Private universities and colleges in Japan
1966 establishments in Japan
Educational institutions disestablished in 2006